HMS Ascot was a  of the Royal Navy. The Racecourse class comprised 32 paddlewheel coastal minesweeping sloops.

Ascot was the last ship to be sunk in the First World War on 10 November 1918, the day before the announcement of the armistice.

References

External links
 Memorial dive report

 

1916 ships
Racecourse-class minesweepers
Royal Navy ship names
World War I shipwrecks in the North Sea
Shipwrecks of Northumberland
Maritime incidents in 1918